Lichnoptera moestoides  is a species of moth of the family Noctuidae. It is found in South America including Peru.

References

Pantheinae
Moths described in 1912